Sewell Chan is an American journalist who is the editor-in-chief of The Texas Tribune. Prior to that he was the editorial page editor at the Los Angeles Times, where he oversaw the editorial board and the Op-Ed and Sunday Opinion pages of the newspaper. Chan worked at The New York Times from 2004 to 2018 in a variety of reporting and editorial positions.

Early life and education
Chan, the son of immigrants from China and Hong Kong, grew up in Flushing, Queens and attended New York City public schools and Hunter College High School, where he was the co-editor of the school's independent newspaper, The Observer. His father was a taxi cab driver.  He graduated from Harvard University with an AB in Social Studies in 1998 and received a Marshall Scholarship for graduate study at Oxford University. He received his MPhil in Politics in 2000. He interned for The Philadelphia Inquirer in 1995, The Wall Street Journal in 1996, and The Washington Post in 1997 and 1999.

Career
From 2000 to 2004, Chan wrote for The Washington Post, where he covered municipal politics, poverty and social services, and education.

After moving to The New York Times in 2004, Chan developed a reputation as a prolific reporter. From 2007 to 2009, Chan was the founding bureau chief of City Room, the newspaper's local news blog, which "helped spark The New York Times digital evolution." Under Chan, City Room was part of The Timess 2009 Pulitzer Prize-winning breaking news reporting which led Eliot Spitzer to resign as governor of New York.

In January 2010, Chan joined The Timess Washington bureau as a correspondent covering economic policy. 

In February 2011, Chan was named deputy editor of the Times Op-Ed page and Sunday Review section. While in that role, Chan was named in 2014 to the Out magazine Out100 list of the most compelling lesbian, gay, bisexual, and transgender people in the world.

From 2015 to 2018, Chan was International News Editor at The New York Times, working in London and then New York.

In August 2018, the Los Angeles Times named Chan a deputy managing editor to "supervise a team of journalists responsible for initiating coverage and developing content for its digital, video and print platforms."

In April 2020, Chan was promoted to editorial page editor, in charge of overseeing the editorial and op-ed pages. He was the lead author of a 2020 editorial examining the Los Angeles Times fraught history with communities of color and journalists of color and apologizing for the newspaper's history of racism. After Donald Trump lost the 2020 election, Chan faced criticism for publishing a full page of letters devoted to Californians who had voted for Trump. Under Chan's  leadership, editorial writer Robert Greene was awarded the 2021 Pulitzer Prize for editorial writing, for his coverage of criminal justice reform in Los Angeles.

Chan was named The Texas Tribune Editor-in-Chief effective October 2021.

Awards and honors
 2021 Executive Program in News Innovation and Leadership, CUNY Craig Newmark Graduate School of Journalism
 2021 Special Citation for Excellence in Journalism, Society of Professional Journalists (for the Los Angeles Times editorial,  "An examination of the Times' failures on race, our apology and a path forward")
 2014 Young Leader, American Council on Germany
 2012 Marshall Memorial Fellowship, German Marshall Fund of the United States
 2010 National Advisory Board Member, The Poynter Institute
 2009 Young Leader, French-American Foundation 
 2003 Rosalynn Carter Fellowship for Mental Health Journalism, The Carter Center

References

External links
 New York Times articles by Sewell Chan
 

1977 births
Living people
Alumni of the University of Oxford
American journalists of Chinese descent
American newspaper reporters and correspondents
American people of Hong Kong descent
Harvard College alumni
Hunter College High School alumni
Marshall Scholars
People from Flushing, Queens
The New York Times writers
The Washington Post people
The Wall Street Journal people
The Philadelphia Inquirer people
Los Angeles Times people
American LGBT journalists